Sosa v. Alvarez-Machain, 542 U.S. 692 (2004), was a United States Supreme Court case involving the Alien Tort Statute and the Federal Tort Claims Act. Many ATS claims were filed after the Second Circuit ruling in Filártiga v. Peña-Irala created a new common law cause of action for torture under the ATS: “For purposes of civil liability, the torturer has become—like the pirate and slave trader before him—hostis humani generis, an enemy of all mankind.” The Court in Sosa does not find there is a similar cause of action for arbitrary arrest and detention. They wrote that finding new common law causes of action based on international norms would require "a substantial element of discretionary judgment", and explain that the role of common law has changed since ATS was enacted meaning the Court will "look for legislative guidance before exercising innovative authority over substantive law". 

The decision states some limitations on recognizing (or creating) new federal common law causes of action under the ATS : "norms of international character accepted by the civilized world and defined with a specificity comparable to the features to the features of those three 18th century paradigms we have recognized".

Background
Kiki Camarena, Drug Enforcement Administration (DEA) special agent was kidnapped and murdered by a Mexican drug cartel in 1985. After an investigation, the DEA concluded that Humberto Álvarez-Machaín had participated in the murder. A warrant for his arrest was issued by a federal district court. The DEA, however, was unable to convince Mexico to extradite Álvarez-Machaín, so they hired several Mexican nationals to capture him and bring him back to the United States. His subsequent trial was appealed all the way to the Supreme Court, which found that the government could try a person who had been forcibly abducted, but that the abduction itself might violate international law and provide grounds for a civil suit. When the case went back to the district court for trial, Álvarez-Machaín was found not guilty for lack of evidence.

Álvarez-Machaín then filed a group of civil suits in federal court against the United States and the Mexican nationals who had captured him under the Federal Tort Claims Act (FTCA), which allows the federal government to be sued on tort claims, and the Alien Tort Statute (ATS), which permits suits against foreign citizens in American courts. The government argued that the FTCA applied only to claims arising from actions that took place in the United States and therefore did not cover Álvarez-Machaín's case because the arrest took place in Mexico. Further, the government and the Mexican nationals argued that the ATS gave federal courts jurisdiction to hear tort claims against foreign citizens, but did not allow private individuals to bring those suits.

The federal district court disagreed with the government's contention that the FTCA claim did not apply, finding that the plan to capture Alvarez-Machain was developed on U.S. soil and therefore covered. However, the court then ruled that the DEA had acted lawfully when they arrested Alvarez-Machain and was therefore not liable. On the ATS claims, the court rejected the argument that private individuals could not bring suit under the Act. The court found that José Francisco Sosa, one of the Mexican nationals who kidnapped Álvarez-Machaín, had violated international law and was therefore liable under the ATS.

On appeal, the Ninth Circuit Court of Appeals overturned the district court's FTCA decision, ruling that the DEA could not authorize a citizen's arrest of Alvarez-Machain in another country and was therefore liable. The appeals court did, however, affirm the lower court's finding on the ATS claim, upholding the judgment against Sosa.

Issue
The Court was tasked with deciding whether the Alien Tort Statute permits private individuals to bring suit against foreign citizens for crimes committed in other countries in violation of the law of nations or treaties of the United States, and whether an individual may bring suit under the Federal Tort Claims Act for an arbitrary arrest that was planned in the United States but carried out in a foreign country.

Decision
On June 29, 2004, the Supreme Court unanimously voted in favor of Sosa and reversed the lower court.  On the Alien Tort Statute claim, the Court unanimously ruled that it did not create a separate ground of suit for violations of the law of nations. Instead, it was intended only to give courts jurisdiction over violations accepted by the civilized world and defined with specificity comparable to the features of the 18th-century paradigms (piracy, ambassadors, and safe conduct). Because Alvarez-Machain's claim did not fall into one of the traditional categories, it was not permitted.

On the FTCA claim, the Court ruled that the arrest had taken place outside the United States and so was exempted from the Act. The Court rejected Alvarez-Machain's argument that the exemption should not apply because the arrest had been planned in the United States.

Alien Tort Statute

The ATS permits an alien plaintiff to file a tort claim against any person over whom the United States has personal jurisdiction, regardless of whether the defendant is a U.S. citizen or a foreign national... and regardless of whether the alleged tort took place within or outside the territory of the United States.  That said, the ATS does not prescribe substantive law: it does not require federal courts to recognize any tort that infringes on individual rights provided by international law.  Instead, the ATS is a jurisdictional statute, which means that the set of justiciable torts is limited to those defined as prohibited norms under either the law of nations or treaties adopted by the United States.  An important note is that the law of nations covers only a subset of international law, more specifically the core set of norms universally binding on world States.  Sosa did not sweep every kind of international law under the reach of the ATS, nor did it rule on which U.S. treaties are justiciable under the statute.  The majority's discussion of treaties serves only to illuminate which sources courts can look to when determining what constitutes the law of nations, as the fact pattern of the case concerns only the latter.  Another point of note is that Sosa only addresses suits between natural persons; claims where plaintiffs and/or defendants are entities (e.g., corporations, governments, etc.) are not part of the Court's holding.  Finally, the Court does not address the asymmetry of rights, whereby alien plaintiffs enjoy a right under the ATS (i.e., federal rather than state jurisdiction over tort damages of any amount) that U.S. citizens do not.

With the above considerations in mind, the Court established a flexible framework for determining which torts constitute causes of action under the ATS.  Four key principles underpin the framework: universality, obligatory nature, specificity, and prudential considerations. 
 UNIVERSALITY.  A cause of action must be universally recognized by the law of nations as a prohibited norm in order to be actionable.  Given the shift in American jurisprudence away from natural law, the law of nations (from the U.S. standpoint) now consists of: mutual obligations that nations have traditionally observed in conduct with one another; "arbitrary law of nations," or norms that nations have voluntarily agreed to either explicitly (e.g., via treaties) or implicitly (e.g., via customary practice); and jus cogens.
 OBLIGATORY NATURE.  The prohibitive norm must be binding or obligatory, not merely hortatory, in order to be actionable.
 SPECIFICITY.  Sosa requires specificity similar to the 18th century common-law causes that were actionable under the ATS at the time of its passage... causes such as piracy, torts against foreign ambassadors, and violations of safe passage.  The Court points to United States v. Smith as a model of the kind of specificity with which piracy was defined.  The specificity in Smith covers the typical elements of a criminal cause of action, such as actus reus, mens rea, harm, causation, remedy, and defenses.  This implies that the law of nations must provide courts with a detailed rule of decision in order for the cause of action to be justiciable.
 PRUDENTIAL CONSIDERATIONS.  A cause of action can be nonjusticiable even though it meets the criteria discussed above IF  prudential factors weigh in favor of nonjustificability... factors such as: public policy, separation of powers, political questions, reticence of domestic courts to command foreign relations, and judicial restraint in legislating new common law.

Since the Court did not directly address procedural factors such as statute of limitations and exhaustion of local remedies (i.e., a principle in international law whereby the plaintiff must exhaust remedies in the nation under whose territorial jurisdiction the tort occurred before having recourse in a foreign court), the Sosa framework might well be incomplete.  Footnote 21 mentions, without deciding, that exhaustion could be a relevant issue to analyze in a future case.  However, the opinion in chief would seem to implicitly reject an exhaustion requirement on account of the policy underlying Congress's decision to have federal courts hear claims by foreign nationals against other foreign nationals for acts committed on foreign soil.  Though the Court does not explicitly pinpoint the policy, it implicitly adopts a hostis humani generis theory and rejects a transitory tort basis for jurisdiction.  One can conclude this from the Court's insistence upon the law of nations as the source of justiciable torts, and its favorable recognition of Filártiga v. Pena-Irala.  Under a transitory tort doctrine, the choice of law is typically the lex locus delicti, or the law of the nation on whose territory the tort was committed.  In contrast, a hostis humani generis (i.e., "enemy of all mankind") theory requires a universal norm such as found in the law of nations.  In Filártiga, the Second Circuit adopted the hostis humani generis rationale, deeming irrelevant the fact that the plaintiff could have a remedy under Paraguayan law (lex locus delicti).

Despite the admonishment to look exclusively to the law of nations, some circuits post-Sosa have filled procedural gaps by borrowing from American precedent.  In Chavez v. Carranza, the Sixth Circuit adopted a ten-year statute of limitations for ATS claims, though allowing for equitable tolling in the interests of fairness.  In Sarei v. Rio Tinto, PLC, the Ninth Circuit remanded the case for an analysis of whether plaintiffs exhausted remedies in the country where the original tort took place, though recognizing that exhaustion is not required in all cases.  The Sarei decision, though based on prudential rather than statutory factors, seems to reject the implication that Sosa leaned toward not recognizing an exhaustion requirement.

References

External links
 

United States Supreme Court cases
United States Supreme Court cases of the Rehnquist Court
2004 in United States case law
Alien Tort Statute case law
Mexico–United States relations
Drug Enforcement Administration litigation